Macroteratura is a genus of Asian bush crickets belonging to the tribe Meconematini in the subfamily Meconematinae. The genus was erected by AV Gorochov in 1993 as a subgenus of Teratura (Macroteratura).  Species also have been described previously in Kuzicus (Macroteraturus) before being placed in this genus in 2020; records are from China and Vietnam (but the known distribution may be incomplete).

Species 
The Orthoptera Species File lists the following species:
subgenus Macroteratura Gorochov, 1993
 Macroteratura inospina Chen, Cui & Chang, 2020
 Macroteratura megafurcula (Tinkham, 1944)- type species (as Xiphidiopsis megafurcula Tinkham); locality: Maan Chi Shan, Guangdong, SE China
 Macroteratura sinica (Bey-Bienko, 1957)
 Macroteratura thrinaca (Qiu & Shi, 2010)
subgenus Stenoteratura Gorochov, 1993
 Macroteratura bhutanica (Ingrisch, 2002)
 Macroteratura janetscheki (Bey-Bienko, 1968)
 Macroteratura kryzhanovskii (Bey-Bienko, 1957)
 Macroteratura twinsloba Liu, 2020
 Macroteratura yunnanea (Bey-Bienko, 1957)

References

External links

Tettigoniidae genera
Meconematinae
Orthoptera of Indo-China